Hélder Joaquim Máximo Catalão, known as Hélder (born 1 May 1955) is a former Portuguese football player.

He played 17 seasons and 335 games in the Primeira Liga for Braga, Académico de Viseu, Beira-Mar and Académica de Coimbra.

Club career
He made his Primeira Liga debut for Académica de Coimbra on 11 May 1975 in a game against CUF Barreiro.

References

1955 births
People from Abrantes
Living people
Portuguese footballers
Associação Académica de Coimbra – O.A.F. players
Primeira Liga players
Académico de Viseu F.C. players
Liga Portugal 2 players
S.C. Braga players
S.C. Beira-Mar players
C.D. Nacional players
Association football goalkeepers
Sportspeople from Santarém District